Terre-Neuve is a commune in the Gros-Morne Arrondissement, in the Artibonite department of Haiti.
It has 17,045 inhabitants.

References

Populated places in Artibonite (department)
Communes of Haiti